The Casa del Cordón (Spanish for "House of the Cord") is a property located in the Colonial City of Santo Domingo, in the Dominican Republic. It is the oldest European stone house in the Americas and probably the first European two-story house. Its name is due to the chiseled sash-and-cord that it presents on its façade, which is associated with the Franciscan Order. It is located on Isabel la Católica street with the corner of Emiliano Tejera.

In 1586, During the Francis Drake's incursion, the balance was installed inside this house with which the belongings that the inhabitants of the city had to deliver to the English pirate were weighed.

This is an Isabelline Gothic and Mudéjar style building. 

It is part of the UNESCO World Heritage Site "Colonial City of Santo Domingo".

History

It was built between 1502 and 1503 and was located in the vicinity of the landing location. It housed Francisco de Garay, a prominent character from the early 16th century who participated in the conquest of Mexico, was governor of Jamaica, adelantado, and servant of Christopher Columbus.

In 1509 the viceroy Diego Columbus with his wife María de Toledo, niece of Ferdinand II of Aragon, they left the city's Homage Tower to Francisco de Tapia and lived briefly in the Casa del Cordón before moving to their official residence. In turn, the Real Audiencia of Santo Domingo was located in this building. Miguel Díaz, alcaide of the Ozama fortress founded by Bartholomew Columbus in the eastern part of the Ozama River, also lived there when the city of Santo Domingo was founded.

It was owned by Manuel Jimenes Ravelo who in turn was the son of President Manuel Jimenes González.

Architecture
The house has two courtyards, in one of which its brick arches are preserved. The distribution of the interiors is similar to that of late-fifteenth-century Castilian palaces, and on its front, on top, is topped with a Mudéjar-type window sill. In the same place it preserves the coat of arms of Francisco de Garay.

It was restored and leased to a banking institution, the Banco Popular Dominicano, which does not allow visitors beyond the hall dedicated to currency exchange, however the building is under state protection.

The chiseled sash-and-cord
The chiseled sash-and-cord that decorates the house has numerous examples in Spain, such as the Palacio del Cordón in Zamora or the Palace of the Constables of Castile in Burgos, and this decoration belongs to the last quarter of the 15th century.

Azulejos
The azulejos placed on the risers of the stairs appeared in the restoration works of the city's cathedral.

See also
List of colonial buildings in Santo Domingo
List of oldest buildings in the Americas

References

Bibliography
Emilio Gómez Piñol, Sevilla y los orígenes del arte hispanoamericano University of Seville. 2003. Pages. 55–56.

Buildings and structures in Santo Domingo
Ciudad Colonial (Santo Domingo)
1503 establishments in the Spanish Empire
Houses completed in 1503
1503 establishments in North America
Gothic architecture in the Dominican Republic
Mudéjar architecture
Isabelline architecture in the Dominican Republic
Columbus family
Francis Drake